"Smile" is a song by English musician James Cottriall, from his second studio album Love Is Louder. It was released in Austria as a digital download on 11 November 2011. It entered the Austrian Singles Chart at number 48, and has peaked to number 12.

Track listing
 Digital download
 "Smile" – 3:55

Chart performance

Release history

References

2011 singles
James Cottriall songs
2011 songs